The 1997 Speedway Grand Prix of Denmark was the sixth and last race of the 1997 Speedway Grand Prix season. It took place on 23 September in the Speedway Center in Vojens, Denmark It was the third Danish SGP and was won by British rider Mark Loram. It was the first win of his career.

Starting positions draw 

The Speedway Grand Prix Commission nominated Jesper B. Jensen from Denmark as Wild Card.

Heat details

The final classification

See also 
 Speedway Grand Prix
 List of Speedway Grand Prix riders

References

External links 
 FIM-live.com
 SpeedwayWorld.tv

Speedway Grand Prix of Denmark
D
1997